Large-headed rice rat can refer to two species of rice rats in the genus Hylaeamys:
Hylaeamys laticeps, or Atlantic forest oryzomys
Hylaeamys megacephalus, or Azara's broad-headed oryzomys

Animal common name disambiguation pages